The Women's team foil competition at the 2022 World Fencing Championships was held on 21 and 22 July 2022.

Draw

Finals

Top half

Section 1

Section 2

Bottom half

Section 3

Section 4

Placement rounds

5–8th place bracket

9–16th place bracket

13–16th place bracket

Final ranking

References

External links
Bracket

Women's team foil
2022 in women's fencing